Whittier Street Health Center is a Federally Qualified Health Center that provides primary care and support services to primarily low-income, racially and ethnically diverse populations mostly from the Roxbury, Dorchester, Mattapan, and the South End neighborhoods of Boston, Massachusetts.

History

Founded in 1933 as a well-baby clinic, Whittier Street Health Center initially focused on women's health. Since then, Whittier has expanded its services to more than 40 different programs, including eye care, dental services, physical therapy, and specialized clinics focused on chronic illnesses such as diabetes, heart disease, and HIV.

In 2011, Whittier was among four organizations recognized by Mayor Thomas Menino and the City of Boston at the Second Annual Mayoral Prize for Innovations in Primary Care. The award was for Whittier's Building Vibrant Communities Program, a partnership with the Boston Housing Authority in which health coordinators connect public housing residents with medical care and community services.

In January 2012, Whittier opened its newly constructed, Silver LEED-certified, 78,900 square foot facility. The $38 million cost was partly funded through a $12 million Human Resources and Services Administration (HRSA) American Recovery and Reinvestment Act grant. The health center's new building gives it capacity to provide up to 220,000 visits annually, or about 70–80,000 patients.

In 2013, Whittier received a $9.5 million grant from the federal Health Resources and Services Administration to combat the chronic conditions prevalent in the communities served by the health center and to expand health care services. The grant enabled Whittier to provide services to patients in the Roxbury and North Dorchester neighborhoods who had been served by the Roxbury Comprehensive Community Health Center (RoxComp), which was put in receivership in April 2013. The grant was distributed in $1.9 million increments every year for five years for planned initiatives including community engagement forums, outreach and education, financial counseling, health insurance enrollment, and transportation and support services.

In 2016 WSHC opened a satellite pharmacy in North Dorchester. The following summer, recognizing that people who live in North Dorchester faced a two-hour commute on public transit to reach its main facility, WSHC opened Whittier@Quincy Commons, a satellite clinic on Blue Hill Avenue, staffed by two full-time doctors, who provide scheduled appointments as well as walk-in services.

Whittier launched a new Mobile Health Van to provide services to the homeless and community residents to address the high rates of Sexually Transmitted Infections in Roxbury and surrounding neighborhoods, especially in the cities “hotspots.”

Within a few weeks of launching the Mobile Health Van, the staff identified two people who tested positive for HIV. Whittier launched an aggressive campaign to help to eradicate HIV in the low communities of Boston. Whittier is focused on addressing the racial and ethnic disparities in health and health care, and the economic and social inequities impacting low income and minority residents.

Whittier Street Health Center has been recognized as one of the Top 100 Women-Led Businesses in Massachusetts by the Boston Globe and The Commonwealth Institute for four consecutive years. The committee considered both nonprofit and for-profit organizations with careful review of each company's revenue, operating budget, number of full-time employees in the state, workplace and management diversity, and innovative projects. On October 24, 2014, the committee recognized President and CEO Frederica M. Williams for her leadership and Whittier's high quality, cost-effective health care for diverse populations. In October 2016, she was recognized by the Boston Business Journal as part of their 2016 Power 50 list celebrating “Influential Bostonians.” and covered in their "2016 Women of Influence" article series. The designation of Top 100 Women-Led Businesses in Massachusetts was once again conferred upon Whittier Street Health Center in 2017.

In June 2018, the center's CEO, Frederica Williams, terminated 20 employees days before a vote to unionize. Ms. Williams attributed the sudden decision to a loss of grant funding, but many employees point out that the health center had been waging an anti-union campaign, hiring consultants and forcing employees to attend anti-union meetings during work hours. Ms. Williams makes approximately $461,000 a year in compensation.

In June 2018, three days prior to the vote to unionize, Whittier Street Health Center CEO and President, announced the need to lay-off 20 employees as the result of the end of one if its federal grants. At the request of union organizers, Boston Mayor Martin Walsh intervened and offered to help Whittier find the funds to retain the fired workers. The workers were reinstated after Whittier management received assurances of funding assistance from Boston City Hall.  A small number of employees, mainly doctors and clinicians, voted to join the union, 1199SEIU United Healthcare Workers East.

Despite the controversy, a few days later the board of directors voted to name the health center's main building after executive director Williams, prompting a scathing column in the Boston Globe.

On January 27, 2020, WSHC announced it has withdrawn recognition from 1199SEIU United Healthcare Workers East after a majority of the employees in the professional bargaining unit represented by the union submitted a petition asking Whittier to withdraw recognition from the union.

Whittier Street Health Center was the first health center in Roxbury, to establish drive-thru and walk-up COVID-19 Testing sites for all Boston residents. 

In 2021, Frederica M. Williams was recognized for her tireless work and being an “Ethnic GEM” by the New England’s magazine as Strong , Determined and Committed to the Community.

Accreditation, recognition, and certifications
In May 2019, Whittier Street Health Center made national news when it announced it had diagnosed two new cases of HIV in Boston's opioid addicted population.  The news confirmed fears from public health advocates that HIV use was spreading in MA and Boston, due primarily to shared needles and increased risky behaviors from the state's addicted and transient populations.

Whittier Street Health Center is accredited by the Joint Commission and recognized by the NCQA as a Level 3 Patient-Centered Medical Home. Its new building received Silver LEED certification from the US Green Building Council.

The outpatient addiction program at Whittier Street Health Center in Roxbury was mentioned in The Boston Globe's article "In Boston, Some Areas Bear Brunt of Opioid Overdoses" on August 6, 2016 for the Health Center's expertise in opioid treatment and use of the antioverdose drug Narcan.

Programs
Whittier provides the following primary care programs: Adult Medicine, Family Medicine, Pediatrics, Dental/Orthodontic, Health Benefits, Laboratory, OB/GYN, Orthopedic, Radiology, Urgent Care, the Wellness and Fitness Club, and WIC. The health center also offers a range of public health programs such as the Dana-Farber Community Cancer Center.

References

External links
 2022 Whittier Street Health Center Annual Report
 2021 Whittier Street Health Center Annual Report
 2020 Whittier Street Health Center Annual Report
 2019 Whittier Street Health Center Annual Report
 2018 Whittier Street Health Center Annual Report
 2017 Whitttier Street Health Center Annual Report
 2013 Whittier Street Health Center Annual Report
 Boston's Health Units: Established from the income of the George White Fund, 1924–1944, City of Boston, Printing Department, 1945

Medical and health organizations based in Massachusetts
Healthcare in Boston
Health centers
Clinics in the United States
1933 establishments in Massachusetts
Organizations established in 1933